Anna Howard may refer to:

Anna Howard (cinematographer)
Anna Howard Shaw, suffragette

See also
Anne Howard (disambiguation)